Pseudozonaria annettae is a species of sea snail, a cowry, a marine gastropod mollusk in the family Cypraeidae, the cowries.

Description
The shell of this species reaches  of length.

Distribution and habitat
This species and its subspecies are found in the Gulf of California and in the seas along Western Mexico and Peru. They can be found under rocks in 8–10 meters of water.

Subspecies
Pseudozonaria annettae aequinoctialis Schilder, 1933
Pseudozonaria annettae annettae Dall, 1909

References
 Lorenz F. & Hubert A. (2000) A guide to worldwide cowries. Edition 2. Hackenheim: Conchbooks. 584 pp
 Burgess: The Living Cowries, 1970

External links
 Biolib
 
 Cypraea

Cypraeidae
Gastropods described in 1909